Abu Hudhaifah ibn al-Mughirah (أبو حذيفة بن المغيرة) was a sahaba of Muhammad and the owner of Sumayyah bint Khabbat.

Biography

Torturing his slaves
He was a chief leader from the Makhzum and was the owner of Sumayyah bint Khabbat in Mecca and let Summayyah marry Yasir ibn Amir in 566, and they had a child named Ammar. But when they all accepted Islam in c.613, Abu Hudhaifah was very angry and teamed up with Abu Jahl, another chief from that clan, to make up a plan to torture them. During a hot and sunny day, he tied them up outside and placed a big stone on top of them. Every day, Abu Jahl forced them to say bad things about Muhammad and say good things about their idol gods. But they refused to say anything bad about Muhammad. One day, he let Abu Jahl kill Sumayyah with his spear. This was the first martyr in the history of Islam. At the same time, Yasir was very old. One day, Yasir was killed because of the extreme pain that they were giving him. The last one was their son, Ammar. They were giving him pain, day and night. One day, during one very big torture, Ammar accepted the idols, even though he still had a strong faith in Allah and he did not mean what he said.

Conversion to Islam 
Abu Hudhaifa converted to Islam in c.630 during en masse when Muhammad, along with 10,000 soldiers, took over Mecca victoriously during the Conquest of Mecca. After that, Abu Hudhaifa became an extremely strong supporter of Muhammad.

See also 
 Makhzum
 Sumayyah bint Khabbat
 Yasir ibn Amir
 Ammar ibn Yasir

References 

Companions of the Prophet